Sali is a village and a municipality in Croatia in the Zadar County. The municipality consists of Dugi Otok and surrounding islands and islets. The total population of the municipality is 1,698 inhabitants, with 740 in the village of Sali itself. The municipality consists of following settlements:

 Božava, population 116
 Brbinj, population 76
 Dragove, population 36
 Luka, population 123
 Sali, population 740
 Savar, population 53
 Soline, population 38
 Veli Rat, population 60
 Verunić, population 40
 Zaglav, population 174
 Zverinac, population 43
 Žman, population 199

References

External links

Municipalities of Croatia
Populated places in Zadar County
Dugi Otok